Putaoa is a genus of East Asian araneomorph spiders in the family Linyphiidae, and was first described by G. Hormiga & L. Tu in 2008.  it contains only three species, found only in Taiwan and China: P. huaping, P. megacantha, and P. seediq.

References

Linyphiidae genera
Linyphiidae
Spiders of China